Home – Phantoms of Summer is the third album by reggae/rock/rap hybrid band The Dirty Heads. The album was released on October 29, 2013.

Track listing

References

2013 albums
Dirty Heads albums
Five Seven Music albums